Caloocan High School abbreviated to CHS also known as CalHigh or Kalhay, is a secondary school in Caloocan, Philippines. It was the largest secondary school in Caloocan, and was established on March 22, 1941.

In the Grace Park District of Caloocan, Rizal, a 2.7 acre school site was established on rice fields in 1940. The 10th Avenue bordered it. Del Mundo St. on the east, Avenue on the south, and P. The Gabaldon-style building, which had 6 regular classrooms and 2 smaller rooms for offices, was finished on December 6, 1944, and was prepared for occupancy the following Monday, December 8. The Japanese bombing of Pearl Harbor prevented this.

History 
By June 1947, the Cecilio Apostol Elementary School could not accommodate the growing number of high school students. Caloocan High School needed to have its own building. In March 1951, the Vocational building was the location for the commencement ceremony. In June Caloocan High School's superintendent, Abdon Javier, decided to move there from the buildings in ninth.

Such an improvement under the leadership of Governor Isidro S. Rodriguez could be seen just in the town but also in  other schools in the province of Rizal, despite Avenue, Grace Park taking the chance that enrollment would decline. 
The town of Caloocan became the city of Caloocan on February 16, 1962. Since then, Caloocan High School (CHS) has grown. In 1967–1968, the school added to two annexes, Andres Bonifacio High School and Toribio Teodoro Memorial High School.

In 1982, the old buildings in Caloocan High School were demolished to make way for the Mayor Macario A. Asistio, Jr. worked to have an administration building built.120 classrooms are presently housed in these structures. English, Filipino, Social Studies, Science, Mathematics, Practical Arts, Home Economics, YD-CAT, and Values Education are among the nine subject areas taught at Caloocan High School, which has a teaching staff of 401. Toribio Teodoro High School, Cecilio Apostol High School, Integrated School for first year, Maria Clara and Tandang Sora annexes were also integrated with Caloocan High School between 1982 and 1983. Each Department is led by a department head or coordinator who oversees and controls the department's operations while also teaching in the department.

References

External links 
 Caloocan High School Facebook Page
 Caloocan High School - Senior High Facebook Page

High schools in Metro Manila
Schools in Caloocan
Educational institutions established in 1941
1941 establishments in the Philippines
Public schools in Metro Manila